The 2006 Harlequins Rugby League season was the twenty-seventh in the club's history, their eleventh season in the Super League and the first as the rebranded Harlequins Rugby League. The club was coached by Tony Rea, competing in Super League XI, finishing in 7th place. The club also got to the Quarter-finals round of the Challenge Cup.

2006 Harlequins Rugby League squad

Sources:SLstats - 2006 Summary

Super League XI table

2006 Challenge Cup
Quins RL were knocked out in the quarter finals by the Leeds Rhinos at Headingley for the second successive year.

References

External links
London Broncos - Rugby League Project

London Broncos seasons
London Broncos